The following is a list of FM radio stations in Tbilisi, Georgia, which were broadcasting as of 30 September 2017. 

There were 35 FM radio stations on 30 September 2017 in Tbilisi.

FM stations

References

External links

Georgia